Sarpi may refer to:

 Sarpi, Georgia, a village by the Black Sea
 Sarpi, Paschim Bardhaman, a census town in West Bengal, India
 Paolo Sarpi, 16th-century Venetian Servite monk and historian
 Liceo Classico Paolo Sarpi, a high school in Bergamo, Italy

See also
Sarpy (disambiguation)